José Antonio "Tete" Morente Oliva (born 4 December 1996) is a Spanish professional footballer who plays for Elche CF as a winger.

Career
Born in La Línea de la Concepción, Cádiz, Andalusia, Morente joined Atlético Madrid's youth setup on 18 January 2014, after stints at AD Taraguilla and Atlético Zabal. He made his senior debut with the C-team on 2 April 2015, starting in a 4–1 Tercera División away loss against Internacional de Madrid CF.

Morente scored his first senior goal on 19 April 2015, netting the equalizer in a 2–1 home win against rivals Real Madrid C. He was promoted to the reserves ahead of the 2015–16 season, with the side now in the fourth tier.

On 31 August 2016, Morente signed a one-year deal with Segunda División B club CD Atlético Baleares. The following 9 July, he agreed to a four-year contract with Gimnàstic de Tarragona in Segunda División.

Morente made his professional debut on 20 August 2017, coming on as a late substitute for Juan Delgado in a 1–0 home loss against UD Almería. He scored his first professional goal the following 4 March, netting the opener in a 2–1 home loss against CD Tenerife.

On 25 January 2019, Morente was loaned to fellow second division side CD Lugo for six months. On 30 June, after avoiding relegation, he was bought by the Galicians due to an obligatory clause on his contract; he signed a permanent deal until 2022.

On 30 January 2020, Morente signed a one-and-a-half-year contract with Málaga CF, still in the second division. On 16 September, he agreed to a four-year deal with Elche CF, newly-promoted to La Liga.

Career statistics

References

External links

1996 births
Living people
Footballers from La Línea de la Concepción
Spanish footballers
Association football wingers
La Liga players
Segunda División players
Segunda División B players
Tercera División players
Atlético Madrid C players
Atlético Madrid B players
CD Atlético Baleares footballers
Gimnàstic de Tarragona footballers
CD Lugo players
Málaga CF players
Elche CF players